The Hornby Clocktower (also known as the Hornby Clock Tower or simply as the clock tower to local residents) was an iconic Christchurch building, situated in the suburb of Hornby on New Zealand State Highway 1. It marked the southern entrance to Christchurch for over 50 years.

Less than three months after a full refurbishment in 2010, the building was damaged in the 2011 Christchurch earthquake and subsequent aftershocks. It was demolished by October 2014.

History

1960s original building 
The original incarnation of the building was constructed some time during the 1960s, and was designed by Don Donnithorne. During its early usage, it was home to the Central Canterbury Electric Power Board.

2010 refurbishment 
The building was refurbished in 2010 and completed by December of that year. It had been redesigned by Wilson and Hill Architects  and was managed by Epoch Property. The upper five floors of the tower were designated as office space. The ground level was reserved for retail space, initially occupied by coffeehouse chain 'Coffee Culture'. It was the only company to rent space in the building after the refurbishment. Outside of the Hornby Clocktower are a separate series of retail stores in the style of a strip mall, designed as an addition to the tower during its final refurbishment, and which still exist after demolition.

Earthquake damage 
The building was largely undamaged by the 2010 Canterbury earthquake during the refurbishment. Less than three months after completion, the tower suffered damaged in the 2011 Christchurch earthquake. Following strong aftershocks in December 2011, it was vacated for the final time. Epoch Property claimed in early 2012 that they wanted to keep the Clocktower, but believed it wouldn't be financially viable to repair the building, and were considering demolition.

Demolition 
Demolition work began on the tower at the end of August 2014. It was completed in October that year. By 2016, the site had been replaced by a Carl's Jr. fast food restaurant.

References

Buildings and structures demolished as a result of the 2011 Christchurch earthquake
Buildings and structures in Christchurch
1960s architecture in New Zealand